"Mother" is a song by American heavy metal band Danzig. It was originally released in August 1988 as the lead single from their debut album, Danzig.

In 1993–1994, almost six years after its original release, a remixed version of the song titled "Mother '93" became a hit on radio and earned Buzz Bin rotation on MTV after a music video incorporating live footage was created to promote the band's new EP, Thrall-Demonsweatlive. During this time the single was reissued by American Recordings, with the remix title updated to "Mother '94" on later versions.

"Mother" remains Danzig's highest charting single. It peaked at number 17 on the Billboard Hot Mainstream Rock Tracks chart and 43 on the Billboard Hot 100. In the UK, the song peaked at number 62 on the singles chart.

Writing and recording
Following the success of "Mother", Glenn Danzig recalled writing the song: "I remember calling Rick Rubin in the middle of the night and telling him that I wrote an incredible song—probably the best song I'd ever written. It was the song I always wanted to write. The first time we played it, people went crazy. But I never wrote that song to make it a hit—I never wrote that way, and I still don't. I write songs so that they say something and do something, and if people like them, great—and if they don't, they don't."

The "Mother '93" remix included extra reverb and a minor modification to the guitar solo. The "live" version of "Mother '93" included an overdubbed concert audience atop the original track.

Content
Thematically, the song is a rhetorical challenge to parents, primarily inspired by Tipper Gore who, along with the Parents Music Resource Center, introduced the Parental Advisory warning placed on albums that contain explicit content. Glenn Danzig explained further: "Al Gore wanted to tell people what they could listen to and what they couldn't...it was basically coming down to the idea that he wouldn't let anybody record any music that he didn't think you should be doing. There was going to be an organization that would tell you what you could and couldn't record. And certainly if you couldn't record it, you couldn't put it out. It was really fascist."

Music video
The video begins with the quotation "Then I saw there was a way to Hell even from the gates of Heaven", taken from The Pilgrim's Progress by John Bunyan. The original 1988 music video was rejected by MTV for its ending sequence, which contains imagery of a chicken being sacrificed and an inverted cross being drawn in its blood (although Glenn Danzig noted that no chickens were actually killed nor harmed).

The "Mother '93" music video used concert footage taken from the band's Halloween 1992 performance at the Irvine Meadows Amphitheater in California, with additional footage shot in the UK.

Both the original "Mother" music video and the live footage version appeared on Beavis and Butt-head, in the episodes "Couch Fishing" and "Crisis Line" respectively.

Covers
The song has been covered by Anberlin, The Independents, Coheed and Cambria, Lissie, Edge of Sanity and by Tim McIlrath of Rise Against. The song has been covered live by Sleater-Kinney, Umphrey's McGee, Motionless in White, Ryan Adams, and as part of The A.V. Club A.V. Undercover series, by the band Wye Oak. There is also a parody cover called "Glenn Leipzig: Mudder" by the German metal band J.B.O.: as Danzig is the name of a formerly German (Prussian) city, Leipzig is the name of an East German city; appropriately the song is sung entirely in a humorous East German accent.

Appearances
"Mother" appears in Erik Ellington's section of the 1997 Zero Skateboards video, Thrill of It All.

"Mother '93" appears in the soundtrack of the  film The Hangover Part III.

"Mother" appears during the end of episode 3 of season 2 of the HBO series Crashing.

During the Mother's Day 2012 episode of The Cleveland Show, titled "Mama Drama", a quick excerpt of the song is played by Rallo and his friends during an elementary school talent show. The animation also mimics the original music video.

"Mother" is featured on the in-game radio station 'Radio X' in the video games Grand Theft Auto: San Andreas and also appeared in True Crime: New York City.

The song appears during the end credits of the video game F.3.A.R. and an episode of Portlandia.

A cover version to which a final solo was added appears in the 2006 music video game Guitar Hero 2, whereas the master track appears in 2009's Guitar Hero Smash Hits. Lissie's cover of the song is used during the Happy Hunting trailer for the 2015 video game Evolve.

While pitching as the closer for the Boston Red Sox in 2004 and 2005, Keith Foulke entered home games to the playing of "Mother". Ryan Doumit of the Minnesota Twins baseball team uses "Mother" as his walk up song. It is also the entrance song for the MMA fighter Gabriel Gonzaga.

A cover of "Mother" appears in the 2017 film American Satan.

"Mother" appears in the 2018 comedy film Tag.

"Mother" appears during the episode 1 of season 2 of the Netflix series Russian Doll.

"Mother" appears in episode 3 of season 1 of the Amazon series Paper Girls.

"Mother" appears in the announcement trailer for the video game The Lords of the Fallen.

Charts

Mother '93

References 

1988 debut singles
1988 songs
Danzig (band) songs
Song recordings produced by Rick Rubin
Protest songs
Songs about mothers
Songs about the media
American Recordings (record label) singles